The Rajendra Memorial Research Institute of Medical Sciences (ICMR-RMRIMS), which is located at Agam Kuan, Patna, Bihar, India is a permanent research institute of the Indian Council of Medical Research, New Delhi and an autonomous body of Ministry of Health and Family Welfare, Government of India.

Location
It is located at Agamkuan in the eastern part of the city of Patna. It has an area of nine acres.

Research
Its main thrust is research in different aspects of Visceral leishmaniasis also known as kala-azar, black fever and Dumdum fever.

History
It is named after the memory of the first president of Republic of India, Dr. Rajendra Prasad. After the demise of Dr. Prasad due to chest disease in Bihar, an institute in the memory of his name focus on chest diseases was established. Thus, the RMRIMS was established on 3 December 1963.

In October 2008, RMRIMS entered into an agreement with the prestigious University of Calcutta, whereby, doctoral candidates of RMRIMS would be supervised by Calcutta University faculty. The institute has been accorded affiliation by Calcutta University for Ph.D and other academic activities.

With this, now the students of Bihar have a choice to conduct their research work under Calcutta University while working at RMRIMS, Patna. It would help in stopping local students from going to Calcutta or other places for better academic institutions.

A few decades ago, the institute did a yeoman's job in inventing medicines for coal mine workers of Dhanbad . Pioneered by Dr (Late) Harkirat Singh , the institute invented a medicine for Coal Miners Pneumoconiosis, an illness very similar to asthma.

See also
 Education in India
 Desert Medicine Research Centre

References

External links
 Official website
 CU accords affiliation to medical institute

Educational institutions established in 1963
University of Calcutta affiliates
Indian Council of Medical Research
Universities and colleges in Patna
Medical colleges in Bihar
1963 establishments in Bihar
Research institutes in Bihar
Memorials to Rajendra Prasad